Daniele Casadei (born 21 July 1973) is a Sammarinese swimmer. He competed in the men's 200 metre freestyle event at the 1992 Summer Olympics.

References

1973 births
Living people
Sammarinese male freestyle swimmers
Olympic swimmers of San Marino
Swimmers at the 1992 Summer Olympics
Place of birth missing (living people)